Judge Walsh may refer to:

James Augustine Walsh (1906–1991), judge of the United States District Court for the District of Arizona
Lawrence Walsh (1912–2014), judge of the United States District Court for the Southern District of New York
Leonard Patrick Walsh (1904–1980), judge of the United States District Court for the District of Columbia

See also
Justice Walsh (disambiguation)